Charles Frederick Lindauer I (1836–1921) was a New York businessman and criminal.  He was involved in the  New York City corruption scandal of 1894, he was the policy dealer; cigar dealer and tobacconist in Manhattan and Hoboken, at Lindauer and Company; he was a Free and Accepted Mason.

Birth 
Charles was born in 1836 in Philadelphia to Oscar Arthur Moritz Lindauer (1815–1866) and Sophia Weber (1815–1891).

Siblings 
John Jacob Lindauer (1841–1888) who married Nellie X (1853–1899), worked as a cigar maker, and had several children and grandchildren; Louis Julius Lindauer (1842–1915) who married Mary Sheehan (1842–1888) and had several children and a few grandchildren but no known great-grandchildren; and Eloise Lindauer I (1852–1944) who married William Arthur Ensko II (1850–1889) and have several children and grandchildren.

Marriage 
In February 1857 Charles married Anna Augusta Kershaw (1841–1931), most likely in New York City.

Children 
Together Charles and Anna had the following children: Eloise Lindauer II (1861–1935) aka Ellie Lindauer, who married Maximillian S. Freudenberg I (1858–1921) aka Max Freudenberg; William Lindauer (1866-c1870); Adeline Lindauer I (1862-before1921) aka Ada Lindauer I, who married Charles L. Schoenfeld (c1860-?); Anna Lillian Lindauer (1872–1956) who married Ira Lowe (1875-bef1910); Harry Chauncey Lindauer I (1877–1923) who married Hannah Shea (1884–?) and died of syphilis; and LeBaron Hart Lindauer (1879–1945) aka Lee Lindauer, who is named after the physician that attended his birth, and he later married Catherine Harney (1878–1966).

Children with other women 
Oscar most likely fathered children with other women and they include: Arthur Oscar Lindauer (1867–1944) who was a trapeze performer who never married and who doesn't appear on the 1870 census with the other children; Grover Cleveland Lindauer (1885–1968) with Mary Dunne as the mother; Louis Miller who is listed as a brother of Grover in a family photo; and Charlotte Lindauer (1869–1894) aka Lottie Lindauer, with Caroline Ritter as the mother. Lottie was buried in Brooklyn with Charles' other children. Other children exist that died at birth or as infants and are buried at Cypress Hills Cemetery in Brooklyn, New York, but their birth and death certificates must still be found in the New York archives to confirm if they are the children of Charles or one of his siblings.

Free and Accepted Mason 
Tom Savini of the Livingston Masonic Library writes: "Brother [Charles] Lindauer received his first Masonic degree in 1861 at the age of 24. His occupation was 'clerk', his birthplace reads 'America', and his residence as 'New York'. The date of his first degree was March 23, 1861; he received his 2nd degree on April 03, 1861; and he completed his membership in the lodge with his 3rd degree on January 27, 1864. It seems possible that Brother Lindauer took part in the Civil War, as it is not usual to have a three-year gap between the 2nd and 3rd degrees."

Manhattan, New York 
In 1866 Charles was listed in the New York City Directory working at 193, 188 and 280 Canal Street at an "exchange" and living in New Jersey. In 1866 he was listed as working at 193 Canal Street at an "exchange".

1870 Census 
In 1870 the name "Charles Lindauer" appears twice in the census in two different households. The first appearance has Charles Lindauer born in "New York" in 1870, living with his mother and his wife Anna, and his first three children: Eloise, William, and Adeline. Missing from the household is Arthur Oscar Lindauer who was born in 1867 but he may have a different mother. A few blocks away in Manhattan, there was a Charles Lindauer born in 1870 in "Pennsylvania", working as a policy dealer. This Charles is listed as the husband of Caroline (Carrie) Titter and they had two children: George Lindauer (1867–?); and Charlotte Lindauer (1869–1894) aka Lottie Lindauer. Charlotte Lindauer was buried in the Lindauer family plot in Cypress Hills under the name "Lottie Landers" and her mother was listed as "Carrie" and the father as "Charles" on her death certificate.

Hoboken, New Jersey 
In 1880 Charles and Anna were living at 51 8th Street in Hoboken, New Jersey with their children and their new son-in-law: Maximillian S. Freudenberg.

Cigars 
Charles was working as a cigar dealer according to the 1880 census. In the 1880–1881 New York City Directory he is listed as selling cigars at 184 Mercer Street, and he was living at 45 Morton Street. His brother Louis Julius Lindauer was also listed as selling "segars". All three brothers appear in the Jersey City and Hoboken Directory of 1880–1890 as cigar dealers or cigar makers.

Lindauer & Company, tobacconists 
The following appears in the Brooklyn Eagle on June 2, 1889:
"News from Jersey City. August Mueller, who was the collector in this city for Lindauer & Co., tobacconist, was sent to jail this morning for contempt of court. His employers were dissatisfied with his returns and had a receiver appointed to examine his accounts. Mueller refused to surrender his books and his arrest followed."

Policy dealer 
Charles Lindauer, the policy dealer, was involved in the 1894–1895 corruption scandal in New York City and his name came up in the Lexow Committee hearings run by State Senator Clarence Lexow of Nyack, New York. Testimony involving Charles was: "Lindauer has a new place [in New York City]; he is a small fry backer."

Rye, New York 
Between 1890 and 1895 Charles moved the family to Rye, Westchester County, New York. He bought the Halsted estate at 209 Locust Avenue and Maple Avenue. The move most likely was by him being named by the Lexow Committee for running a numbers game in Manhattan. The oral family tradition was that he owned several "wine or beer gardens" and lived in a huge estate in Rye. In 1900 he was living in Rye with his unmarried children and two nephews: Grover Dunne; and Louis Miller. Grover and Louis appear in a family photograph, but where they fit in family tree is not certain yet. It's possible that Charles fathered the two "nephews" with other women. Grover Dunne aka Grover Cleveland Lindauer (1885–1968) never would talk about his parents, but his death certificate lists his mother as "Mary Dunne" and his father as "Charles Lindauer". In 1910 the family was living at 209 Locust Avenue in Rye and they were living with: Anna Lindauer, now a widow, and her two children: Blanche Lowe (1898–1998); and Joseph (Joe) Lowe (1903–1979). Both Charles and his son, LeBaron, appear in the 1914–1915 Rye City Directory with LeBaron working as a clerk. In 1920 Charles and Anna were still living at 209 Locust Avenue, but now in the house was their son, Arthur Oscar Lindauer. In 1920 Charles' other son, Harry was living at 38 Elm Place in Rye, with his wife, child and the following siblings: LeBaron Hart Lindauer (1879–1945) and his wife Catherine Harney (1878–1966); Anna Lindauer (1873–1956) the widow of Ira Lowe I (1870-bef1910) and her two children, Blanche and Joseph Lowe.

Death 
Charles died in 1921 of "myocarditis" and he was buried in Greenwood Union Cemetery in Rye, New York with his wife, and daughter Anna Lillian Lindauer (1872–1956) who married Ira Lowe.

Obituary 
His obituary appeared in the Port Chester Daily Item on Thursday, March 3, 1921 and reads as follows:
"Charles F. Lindauer, a resident of Rye for thirty years or more, died at his home on Locust Avenue at 3:40 yesterday afternoon. Deceased was in his eighty-eighth year and had been a sufferer from a complication of diseases. His confinement to bed had been quite brief, however, inasmuch as he was quite active only a few weeks ago, when he and his wife celebrated the sixty-fourth anniversary of their marriage. Of a retiring disposition, Mr. Lindauer had never taken active part or interest in public affairs of any kind. He and his family had occupied the old Halsted place at the corner of Maple and Locust avenues during the entire period of their residence in the village. Mr. Lindauer having been the head of a flourishing business in New York for a number of years after coming here. Deceased is survived by his widow and five children: Mrs. Anna Lowe, Arthur, LeBaron and Harry Lindauer, all of Rye, and Mrs. Eloise Freudenberg of Jersey City Heights, N.J. The funeral and interment will be private."

References 
Brooklyn Eagle, June 2, 1889, "Lindauer tobacco"
New York Times, October 12, 1894, page 1, "Lexow committee"
Lexow Committee: Report and proceedings of the Senate committee appointed to investigate the police department of the city of New York, 1895, pages 3276-3280
New York Times; October 12, 1894, Wednesday; Paid $500 To Schmittberger; Forget Says This Tribute Went To The Police Captain. The Agent Of The French Line Tells The Lexow Committee Of The Money Transaction. Complete Exposure Of The Policy Business In This City. A List Of 600 Places Where The Gambling Was Conducted. Only One Precinct Free From The Evil.
Obituary, Charles F. Lindauer, Port Chester Daily Item; March 3, 1921

External links 
Findagrave: Charles Lindauer

1836 births
1921 deaths
Businesspeople from New York (state)
Criminals from New York (state)